The Lahore High Court Bar Association  is situated in Lahore.

Lahore Bar (presently Lahore High Court Bar) as a collective group took birth somewhere before 1892-93 and its first President  was elected in 1893. In 1910 the Executive Committee  recommended that the Bar Association should be registered accordingly. The General House on 9 June 1910, accepted the recommendations and registered it as Bar Association.

History

The earliest trace of the Lahore High Court Bar as a body to be acknowledged and accepted starts from 1882. In October, 1882, the judges of the Chief Court  passed a resolution requesting Mr. C. H. Spitta, Barrister-at-Law (then a leading member of the legal fraternity and later to become a temporary judge of the Chief Court) to convene a Special Meeting of the Bar, to devise measures to root out touting. In compliance with this Resolution, Mr. C. H. Spitta convened a meeting of the Lahore Bar on 22 November 1882, in the Bar Room and at which five Barristers and thirteen Pleaders attended. The meeting was presided by Mr. C. H. Spitta. At the meeting, ten resolutions to root out touting were passed by the Lahore Bar and their copies transmitted to the Registrar of the Chief Court, for his attention. These were received and under the orders of the Judges, circulated by the Chief Court to all the Commissioners and Superintendents of the various Divisions for compliance.

Apart from the above, there is no further evidence of the Lahore Bar till 1892–93. Out of the Association's available records, the register containing the Minutes of the earliest General Meetings of the Chief Court Bar Association starts from the year 1893. The file dealing with the subject "Touts-High Court" amongst the High Court's records, contains the copy of a letter addressed to the Secretary of the Bar Association in 1892 and his seems to be the earliest letter traceable from the various High Court files addressed to the legal fraternity practicing in the Chief court in its capacity as an Association.

From these items of evidence, it can fairly be inferred that the Lahore Bar assumed some maturity by 1882 and became an entity which commanded attention and to which the Chief Court had to look to for assistance. But the Lahore Bar as a collective group or entity took birth somewhere after 1882 and before 1892–93.

In 1910 the executive committee recommended that the Chief Court Bar Association should be registered and that the Secretary should take necessary steps for this purpose. The General House in its meeting held on 9 June 1910, accepted the recommendations of the committee.

Notable former presidents
Abid Hassan Minto
Hamid Khan (lawyer)
Khalid Ranjha 
Nasira Iqbal 
Asrar-ul-Haq Mian
 Hafiz Abdul Rehman Ansari
Ahmad Awais
 Abid Saqi
 Ch Zulfiqar Ali
 Rana Zia Abdul Rahman
 Anwaar ul Haq Pannun
 Tahir Nasrullah Warraich
 Maqsood Buttar

Notable Former Secretaries

 Saqib Nisar 
 Rana Mashood Ahmad Khan
 Azam Nazeer Tarar
 Babar Murtaza
 Malik Arshad Awan
 Rana Asad Ullah Khan
 Shehram Sarwar Chaudhary
 Hassan Iqbal Warraich
 Rai Usman Ahmad

See also
 Supreme Court Bar Association of Pakistan
 Pakistan Bar Council
 Punjab Bar Council
 Asrar-ul-Haq Mian
 Islamabad Bar Council

References

External links
 https://www.pakistantoday.com.pk/2017/02/26/lahore-high-court-bar-association-election-results/

Punjab Bar Council
Organizations established in 1882
1882 establishments in the British Empire